Dr. John Morton Evans (1871 – 1956) was a British philatelist who signed the Roll of Distinguished Philatelists in 1935. In 1953, Morton Evans was awarded the Tilleard Medal by the Royal Philatelic Society London for his display of the stamps of British Guiana. He was the President of the Bristol and Clifton Philatelic Society which he had joined in 1898.

References

Signatories to the Roll of Distinguished Philatelists
1871 births
1956 deaths
British philatelists
Philately of British Guiana